The Last of the Big Plungers is an album by trombonist Al Grey and the Basie Wing released in 1960 on Argo Records.

Track listing 
 "Things Ain't What They Used to Be" (Mercer Ellington, Ted Persons) – 3:41
 "Open Wider, Please" (Al Grey) – 4:48
 "I Got It Bad (and That Ain't Good)" (Duke Ellington, Paul Francis Webster) – 3:15
 "Don't Get Around Much Anymore" (Duke Ellington, Bob Russell) – 3:03
 "How Come You Do Me Like You Do?" (Gene Austin, Roy Bergere) – 2:29
 "Bluish Grey" (Thad Jones) – 3:10
 "The Elder" (Jones) – 5:10
 "Bewitched" (Richard Rodgers, Lorenz Hart) – 3:34
 "Kenie-Konie" (Frank Foster) – 6:03

Personnel 
Al Grey – trombone, bandleader
Joe Newman – trumpet
Benny Powell – trombone
Billy Mitchell – tenor saxophone
Charlie Fowlkes – baritone saxophone
Floyd Morris – piano
Ed Jones – bass
Sonny Payne – drums

References 

1960 albums
Al Grey albums
Argo Records albums